Hilary Tann (2 November 1947 – 8 February 2023) was a Welsh composer based in the United States.

Career
Born in Llwynypia, Glamorgan (Wales), Tann held degrees in music composition from the University of Wales, Cardiff, and Princeton University. Her compositions are published by Oxford University Press. Tann's orchestral works have been released on the North/South Recordings CD Here, the Cliffs, – "music of great integrity, impeccable craft, and genuine expressive ambition" Robert Carl, Fanfare 36:I. Her overture, "With the Heather and Small Birds," commissioned by the 1994 Cardiff Festival, is her tribute to the land of her birth.

Until 2019 she was the John Howard Payne Professor of Music at Union College in Schenectady, New York, where she had been since 1980, teaching courses on music theory and composition, in addition to founding the Union College Orchestra. Tann was the invited Guest Composer-in-Residence for the 2011 Women in Music Festival, Eastman School of Music, where her commissioned work, "Exultet Terra" for SATB double chorus and double reed quartet was given its world premiere and the 2013 Women Composers Festival of Hartford.

Honors and awards 
Tann's honors included the selection of her piano composition, "Light from the Cliffs," as a repertoire choice in the 2012 William Kappell International Piano Competition and Festival. She received grants from ASCAP Standard Awards 1996–present, Meet The Composer, NEA, NYSCA, Welsh Arts Council, VW Trust, Holst Foundation, American Composers Forum, and the Hanson Institute for American Music Awards.

Notable works 
Her works include concertos for violin ("Here, the Cliffs" premiered by the North Carolina Symphony with Corine Brouwer Cook, 1997), alto saxophone ("In the First, Spinning Place" premiered by the University of Arizona Symphony with Debra Richtmeyer, March 2000), and cello ("Anecdote," premiered by the Newark [Delaware] Symphony with Romanian cellist Ovidiu Marinescu, December 2000).

"Shakkei," a diptych for oboe solo and chamber orchestra, was premiered by Virginia Shaw in the Presteigne Festival, August 2007, and has been performed multiple times, including in Dublin, at the 2008 IAWM Congress in Beijing, in New York City, Rio de Janeiro, San Francisco, and at the 15th World Saxophone Congress in Bangkok (2009), with Susan Fancher (solo soprano saxophone) and the Thailand Philharmonic Orchestra.

Other works include Psalm 104 (Praise, my soul), composed for the North American Welsh Choir, "Contemplations 21, 22" composed for the Radcliffe Choral Society, and First Watch, a composition for carillon.

Selected works

For Orchestra 

As Ferns (1992), for string orchestra
Walls of Morlais Castle (1998), for string orchestra
Toward Dusk (2001), for string orchestra
Water's Edge (1993), for string orchestra
Adirondack Light (1992), for chamber orchestra
Shakkei (2007), for chamber orchestra
With the Heather and Small Birds (1994), for chamber orchestra
Fanfare for a River (2001)
From Afar (1996)
From the Feather to Mountain (2004)
High Rock Spring (2009)
Reibo (2009)
Sarsen (2001)
Grey Tide and Green (2001)
Open Field (1990)
Through Echoing Timber (1996)

Instrumental Solos 

A Sad Pavan Forbidding Mourning (2002), for guitar
Doppelganger (1984), for piano
Embertides (2014), for organ
First Watch (2003), for carillon
Kilvert's Hills (2010), for bassoon
Light from the Cliffs (2005), for piano
Like Lightnings (2004), for oboe
Look Little Low Heavens (1992), for trumpet
Pinnae Ventorum (2006), for organ
Seven Poems of Stillness (2008), for cello with optional narrator
The Cresset Stone (1993), for cello, viola, or violin
Windhover (1985), for soprano saxophone

Chamber Ensembles 

And the Snow Did Lie (Et La Neige Resta) (2014), for string quartet
Duo (1981), for oboe and viola
From the Song of Amergin (1995), for flute, viola, and harp
Gardens of Anna Maria Luisa de Medici (2003), for flute, cello, and piano
In the Theater of Air (2017), for piano, cello, and piano
Llef (1995), flute and cello
Melangell Variations (2018), for piano and soloists
Nothing Forgotten (1997),for violin, cello, and piano
Of Erthe and Air (1991), for flute, clarinet, and percussion
On Ear and Ear... (2011), for piano and viola
Shoji (2010), for flute and oboe
... Slate, Blue-Gray (2012), for violin, cello, and piano
Solstice (2014), for marimba and piano
Some of the Silence (2010), for saxophone quartet
The Walls of Morlais Castle (2001), for oboe, viola, and cello
Water's Edge (1994), for piano duet
Winter Sun, Summer Rain (1992), for flute, clarinet, viola, cello, celeste

Vocal Works 

 A Girl's Song To Her Mother (1999), for soprano and oboe
 Arachne (1987), for soprano and crotale
 Between Sunsets (2012), for soprano and piano
 Melangell Variations (2018), for string orchestra, baritone, and soprano
 Mother and Son (1996), for soprano, E-flat clarinet, viola, cello
 Songs of the Cotton Grass (1999), for soprano and oboe
 Sound Dawn (1991), for tenor, baritone, bass, and piano
 The Moor (1997), for soprano and alto chorus
 Vale of Feathers (2005), for soprano and oboe
 Wings of the Grasses (2003), for soprano and oboe

References

External links
Official Hilary Tann Website
New York Women Composers
Oxford University Press Composer

1947 births
Living people
Alumni of Cardiff University
Composers for carillon
British women composers
Union College (New York) faculty
Welsh composers